Common names: shield tail snakes, shield-tailed snakes, earth snakes.

Uropeltis is a genus of nonvenomous shield tail snakes endemic to Peninsular India. As of 2022, 26 species are recognized as being valid.

Geographic range
Most Uropeltis species are found in the hills of Peninsular India, mainly in the southwestern parts of the country, including the Western Ghats and, to some extent, also in the Eastern Ghats and in the hills of Central India.

Description
Species in the genus Uropeltis share the following characters. The eye is in the ocular shield. There are no supraoculars nor temporals. There is no mental groove. The tail is conical or obliquely truncated, terminating in a small scute, the end of which is square, or bicuspid with the points side by side.

Species

T Type species.

Nota bene: A taxon author in parentheses indicates that the species was originally described in a genus other than Uropeltis.

References

Further reading
Boulenger GA (1890). The Fauna of British India, Including Ceylon and Burma. Reptilia and Batrachia. London: Secretary of State for India in Council. (Taylor and Francis, printers). xviii + 541 pp. (Genus Silybura, p. 257, Figure 81).
Cuvier [G] (1829). Le Régne Animal Distribué, d'après son Organisation, pour servir de base à l'Histoire naturelle des Animaux et d'introduction à l'Anatomie Comparé. Nouvelle Edition, Revue et Augmentée [second edition]. Tome II [Volume 2]. Les Reptiles. Paris: Déterville. xv + 406 pp. (Uropeltis, new genus, pp. 76–77). (in French).
Das I (2002). A Photographic Guide to Snakes and other Reptiles of India. Sanibel Island, Florida: Ralph Curtis Books. 144 pp. . (Genus Uropeltis, pp. 59–60).
Smith MA (1943). The Fauna of British India, Ceylon and Burma, Including the Whole of the Indo-Chinese Sub-region. Reptilia and Amphibia. Vol. III.—Serpentes. London: Secretary of State for India. (Taylor and Francis, printers). xii + 583 pp. (Genus Uropeltis, p. 73).
Wall F (1921). Ophidia Taprobanica or the Snakes of Ceylon. Colombo, Ceylon [Sri Lanka]: Colombo Museum. (H.R. Cottle, Government Printer). xxii + 581 pp. (Genus Uropeltis, pp. 23–25, Figures 7-9).
Ganesh SR (2015). Shieldtail snakes (Reptilia: Uropeltidae)– the Darwin's finches of south Indian snake fauna? Manual on Identification and Preparation of Keys of Snakes with Special Reference to their Venomous Nature in India., Govt. Arts College, Ooty, 13-24.
Pyron RA, Ganesh SR, Sayyed A, Sharma V, Wallach V, Somaweera R (2016). "A catalogue and systematic overview of the shield-tailed snakes (Serpentes: Uropeltidae)". Zoosystema 38 (4): 453–506.
Rajendran MV (1985). "Studies on Uropeltid Snakes". Madurai: Publication Division, Madurai Kamaraj University. 132 pp.
Sharma RC (2003). Handbook: Indian Snakes. Kolkata: Zoological Survey of India. 292 pp. .
Whitaker R, Captain A (2008). Snakes of India: The Field Guide. Chennai: Draco Books. 495 pp. .

External links

Captain, Ashok (2003). Checklist of Indian Snakes with English Common Names. PDF at the University of Texas at Austin. Accessed 2 September 2007.

Genus Uropeltis  at Systema Naturae 2000. Accessed 2 September 2007.

Uropeltidae
Taxa named by Georges Cuvier
Snake genera